Wallada bint al-Mustakfi (born in Córdoba in 994 or 1010 – died March 26, 1091) was an Andalusian poet.

Early life
Wallada was the daughter of Muhammad III of Córdoba, one of the last Umayyad Cordoban rulers, who came to power in 1024 after assassinating the previous caliph Abderraman V, and who himself was assassinated two years later in Uclés.  Her early childhood was during the high period of the Caliphate of Córdoba, under the rule of Al-Mansur Ibn Abi Aamir. Her adolescent years came during the tumultuous period following the eventual succession of Aamir's son, Sanchuelo, who in his attempts to seize power from Hisham II brought the caliphate into civil war. As Muhammad III had no male heir, Wallada inherited his properties, and used them to open a palace and literary hall in Córdoba. There she offered instruction in poetry and the arts of love to women of all classes, from those of noble birth to slaves purchased by Wallada herself. Some of the great poets and intellectuals of the time also visited.

Beauty, poetry and controversy
Wallada was an ideal beauty of the time: blonde, fair-skinned and blue-eyed, intelligent, cultured and proud.  She also was somewhat controversial, walking out in public without a hijab and in the fashion of the harems of Baghdad, she wore transparent tunics and embroidered her verses on the trim of her clothing.  Her behavior was regarded by the local Imams as perverse and was strongly criticized, but she also had numerous people who defended her honor, like Ibn Hazm, the famous author of The Ring of the Dove. A Cordovan custom of the time was for poets to compete in finishing incomplete poems. Wallada gained recognition for her skill, particularly as a woman in what was almost entirely a male competition.

One example of Wallada's work is her 'Taraqqab idha ja'a l-zalamu ziyarati' (When night falls, anticipate me visiting you), addressed to Ibn Zaydun. The poem is in the tawil metre (14-syllable hemistichs comprising alternating 3-syllable and 4-syllable feet of a short syllable followed by two or three long ones, rhyming in -ri)

Relationship with Ibn Zaydún
It was during one of these poetry competitions that she met the great love of her life, the poet Ibn Zaydún. Zaydún was also a poet and a nobleman who had been making measured political strides towards Cordoba. Because of this and Zaydún's ties with the Banu Yahwar — rivals of her own Umayyad clan — their relationship was controversial and had to remain a secret.

Eight of the nine poems preserved from Wallada were written about their relationship, which apparently ended under contentious circumstances.  Written as letters between the two lovers, the poems express jealousy, nostalgia, but also a desire to reunite. Another expresses deception, sorrow and reproach. Five are sharp satires directed against Zaydún, whom she criticized for, amongst other things, having male lovers. In one writing, it was implied that the relationship ended because of an affair between Ibn Zaydún and a "black lover". The verse was as follows:

You know that I am the moon of the skies
But, to my disgrace, you have preferred a dark planet.

Some say that the lover was a slave girl purchased and educated as a poet by Wallada, while others speculate that it could have been a male.  A third possibility is that the poem was written in response to the times, as infidelity with black lovers was a common theme in Islamic poetry.  The last of the nine poems alludes to Wallada's liberty and independence.

Relationship with Ibn Abdús

After her split with Zaydún, Wallada entered a relationship with the vizier Ibn Abdús, who was one of Zaydún's major political rivals.  Abdús, who was completely enamored with Wallada, would end up seizing Zaydun's properties and having him imprisoned. Soon afterwards Wallada moved into the vizier's palace, and although she never married him, he remained by her side and protected her until his death, well into his 80s.

Death

Wallada died on March 26, 1091, the same day that the Almoravids entered Cordova.

Legacy
Among Wallada's most outstanding students was Muhya bint al-Tayyani,  the young daughter of a fig salesman, whom Wallada welcomed into her house. After Wallada's death, Muhja would go on to write a number of kind satires about her.

References

Other sources
Dozy, R. P. Historia de los musulmanes en España . Madrid, Turner, 1988.
Garulo, T. Diwan de las poetisas andaluzas de Al-Andalus. Madrid, Ediciones Hiperión, 1985.
López de la Plaza, G. Al-Andalus: Mujeres, sociedad y religió. Málaga, Universidad de Málaga, 1992.
Sobh, M. Poetisas arábigo-andaluzas. Granada, Diputación Provincial, 1994.

External links
Andalucia.com article
A Biography of Wallada 
Another Biography 
Project Continua: Biography of Wallada bint al-Mustakfi Project Continua is a web-based multimedia resource dedicated to the creation and preservation of women’s intellectual history from the earliest surviving evidence into the 21st Century.
 Portrait of Wallada by J.L. MUÑOZ

1091 deaths
Arabic-language women poets
Arabic-language poets
People from Córdoba, Spain
11th-century women writers
11th-century Arabic writers
Women poets from al-Andalus
Umayyad dynasty
11th-century Arabs
994 births
Children of Umayyad caliphs